Robert Anthony Ellis (born 24 August 1956) is a British academic and Baptist minister, who was the Principal of Regent's Park College, Oxford, England from 2007 to 2021.

Biography
Robert Ellis was born in Cardiff and educated at Regent's Park College, Oxford, and received his DPhil from the University of Oxford in 1984. He is an ordained minister in the Baptist Union of Great Britain and has served congregations in Milton Keynes and Bristol. He was Principal of Regent's Park College from 2007 to 2021. Ellis also plays a major role in Training and Formation for Baptist Ministers' training at the College.

He has expertise in pastoral theology and systematic theology, the theology of intercession, and Christianity and culture - especially theology and film, and theology and sport. He serves on the Advisory Committee of the Vatican-sponsored programme 'Sport at the Service of Humanity.'

He delivered the McCandless Lecture at Georgetown College in 2005 and again in 2010.

He has been Moderator of the Baptist Union of Great Britain Ministry Executive, and currently serves on the Baptist Steering group and Baptist Union of Great Britain Council.

His nephew is the actor Tom Ellis.

Works

Theses

Books

as Editor

Chapters in books

Articles in journals

Sources
The Georgetonian 6 April 2005
Oxford University Theology Faculty
British Baptist Theologians: Robert Ellis

References

1956 births
Living people
20th-century British theologians
Alumni of Regent's Park College, Oxford
Fellows of Regent's Park College, Oxford
English Baptist ministers
Clergy from Cardiff
English Baptist theologians
20th-century Christian clergy
Systematic theologians
Baptist writers
Principals of Regent's Park College, Oxford